Mašťov is a town in Chomutov District in the Ústí nad Labem of the Czech Republic. It has about 600 inhabitants. The town centre is well preserved and is protected by law as an urban monument zone.

Administrative parts
Hamlets of Dobřenec and Konice are administrative parts of Mašťov.

Geography
It briefly borders Germany in the north. It lies in the Doupov Mountains. The Sedlec pond is located in the northwestern part of the municipal territory and together with its surroundings, it is protected as a nature reserve. There are also several other smaller ponds.

History

The first written mention of Mašťov is from the first half of the 12th century, when it was awarded to the local aristocrat Milhost by Soběslav I.

Throughout seven centuries the town changed hands multiple times due to political instability, economic hardship, and several wars that also subjected the town to plunder, disease, fire, and famine. In 1918, when the independent country of Czechoslovakia was formed with Mašťov located in the northwestern part of the country, the town was still dealing with the after effects of the World War I, such as homelessness and unemployment. Gradually the town recovered, but the booming economy was affected by the worldwide depression of the 1930s.

During World War II Mašťov was a part of the Sudetenland, awarded to Germany through the Munich Agreement, with all Czech residents forced to leave their homes and move to the central part of Bohemia. After the war the town slowly recovered but never fully developed into the business and industrial town it had been before.

Sights
The main landmark is the Mašťov Castle. In 1571, Jan Valdemar of Lobkowicz had a Renaissance castle built on the site of a former fortress and Gothic castle. In the 17th century, it was modified in the Baroque style. Today it serves as an orphanage.

Other sights include Church of the Assumption of the Virgin Mary, Church of Saint Barbara, funeral chapel of the Mladotové of Solopysky noble family, a rectory, and a Jewish cemetery.

References

External links

Cities and towns in the Czech Republic
Populated places in Chomutov District